Per Verner Vågan Rønning (born 9 January 1983) is a former Norwegian footballer. He has previously played for Kongsvinger, AIK, Bodø/Glimt, Rosenborg and Levanger.

Career
Rønning made his debut for AIK on 17 April against IFK Göteborg as a left wing-back. He gave an assist to goalscorer Miran Burgič who headed in the equalizer in the match. Rønning was injured most of the 2007 season. He only played in three Allsvenskan matches that season.

In January 2008 he transferred from AIK to Bodø/Glimt, and played there until he moved to Rosenborg the summer 2011. At winter 2015 Rønning was loaned back to his former club Levanger for the first half of the season. The move was made permanent in July.

Career statistics

References

External links
Profile at Bodø/Glimt club website

1983 births
Living people
People from Levanger
Norwegian footballers
Kongsvinger IL Toppfotball players
AIK Fotboll players
FK Bodø/Glimt players
Rosenborg BK players
Eliteserien players
Allsvenskan players
Norwegian expatriate footballers
Expatriate footballers in Sweden
Norwegian expatriate sportspeople in Sweden
Norwegian First Division players
Association football defenders
Sportspeople from Trøndelag